Anastasios Kritikos (born 1914, date of death unknown) was a Greek footballer. He played in eight matches for the Greece national football team from 1934 to 1938. He was also part of Greece's team for their qualification matches for the 1938 FIFA World Cup.

Honours

Panathinaikos
Panhellenic Championship: 1948–49
Greek Cup: 1931–32, 1947–48
Athens FCA League: 1934, 1937, 1939, 1949

References

External links

1914 births
Year of death missing
Greek footballers
Greece international footballers
AEK Athens F.C. players
Panathinaikos F.C. players
Place of birth missing
Association footballers not categorized by position